Harald Holz (born 14 May 1930, in Freiburg im Breisgau) is a German philosopher, logician, mathematician (autodidact), poet and novelist.

Life 

Holz studied philosophy from 1953 to 1957 in Pullach im Isartal/Germany (lic. phil. schol.) and from 1959 until 1961 Catholic Theology at the Johann Wolfgang Goethe University Frankfurt/Germany (bac. theol.). He continued his study of philosophy at the Rheinische Friedrich-Wilhelms University Bonn/Germany. There he received his research doctorate in 1964 with Gottfried Martin with the thesis Transcendental philosophy and metaphysics.

Since 1964 he was assistant professor at the Institute of Philosophy at Ruhr University Bochum/Germany. In 1969 he published his Second Book with the university entitled Speculation and Facticity. On middle-aged and late Schelling's concept of freedom. Since 1971 he was Research Associate and Professor with Ruhr University Bochum. Since 1976 he was Chair Professor and Director of the Institute of Fundamental Philosophical-Theological Questions at the Westfalian Wilhelm University Münster/Germany. In 1979 and in 1983 he was visiting scholar at George Washington University in Washington D.C. Further he was director, together with E. Wolf-Gazo, implementing the first Inter-national Congress on the Philosophy of A. North Whitehead 1981 at the University of Bonn, then director of the congress: ‘Kant in the Hispanidad’, together with J. E. Dotti and H. Radermacher 1983 at the university of Cologne, and further director, together with H. Radermacher and A. Engstler, of the congress: ‘The liberation of Hispano-America, Philosophical contexts’ 1984 at the university at Münster/Westfalia.

Philosophy 
As a systematic basic concept he replaces substance metaphysics totally by relation subsistence: Relationality is no longer an addition to existing concepts, but its reasoning and in the first place constitutes terminativity.

References

Further reading 

 A. Engstler, H.-D. Klein (Hg.), Perspektiven und Probleme systematischer Philosophie. Harald Holz zum 65. Geburtstag, Fft/M u.ö. (P. Lang) 1996. 
 Porträt: Harald Holz wird 70, in: Wiener Jahrbuch für Philosophie XXXII (1999), 285-292.
 Xavier Tilliette, Rezension: Spekulation und Faktizität, Zum Freiheitsbegriff des mittleren und späten Schelling, Bonn (Bouvier) 1970, in: Archives de Philosophie 34 (1971) 314 – 316. 
 Fernando Inciarte, Rezension: Thomas von Aquin und die Philosophie, Ihr Verhältnis zur thomasischen Theologie in kritischer Sicht, Paderborn/München (Schöningh) 1975, in: Theologische Revue 74 (2/1978). 3 pp.
 Friedrich Wallner, Rezension: System der Transzendentalphilosophie im Grundriß, 2 Bde. Freiburg/München (Alber) 1977, in: Philos. Literaturanzeiger 34 (1/1983) 72 -80, bes.: 78 – 80. 
 Hans-Dieter Klein, Rezension: System der Transzendentalphilosophie im Grundriß, 2 Bde. Freiburg/München (Alber) 1977, in: Wiener Jahrb. f. Philosophie XIII (1985) 218 – 221. 
 Hans-Dieter Klein, Rezension: Metaphysische Untersuchungen, Meditationen zu einer Realphilosophie, Bern u. a. (Lang) 1997, in: Wiener Jahrb. f. Philosophie XXI (1998) 204 – 206. 
 Thomas Weiß, Rezension: Geist in Geschichte, Idealismus-Studien, Würzburg (Königshausen & Neumann) 2 Halb-Bde., in: prima philosophia 8 (1995) 448 – 450. 
 Heinrich Euler, Rezension: Der zerrissene Adler, Eine deutsche Geschichtsphilosophie, Münster (Lit) 1995, in: Mitteilungen der Humboldt-Gesellschaft (Mannheim), 34 (Oktober/1999) 168 – 171.
 Gregor Paul, Rezension: Ost und West als Frage strukturologischer Hermeneutik: Zur Frage einer 'Brücke' zwischen abendländisch-europäischer und chinesischer Philosophie; East and West as Theme of a Structurological Hermeneutics: The Question of a 'Bridge' between Occidental-European and Chinese Philosophy, Essen (Die Blaue Eule), 1998, in: Deutsche China-Gesellschaft – Mitteilungsblatt 42 (2/1999) 58 – 60.
 Wolfram Schommers, Rezension: Kosmische Polarität und Transformation. Traktat über kosmologische Logik und Erkenntnistheorie nebst kritisch-alternativen Reflexionen zur sog. 'Supergravitation', Münster (Lit) 2001, in: Mens agitat molem, Mitteilungen der Humboldt-Gesellschaft (Mannheim), hrsg. v. D. Haberland, 36 (2003) 190 – 191.
 Karen Gloy, Die Kosmologie von Harald Holz, in: Wiener Jahrb. f. Philosophie XXXVII (2006), 293 – 305.
 Alexander Ph. Grundorath, Transzendentale Kosmologie – Harald Holz’ Beiträge zum Entwurf einer alternativen Idee von Humanexistenz, Universität Wien 2010, 244 pp. (doctoral thesis).

External links 
 
 Detailed biography and bibliography
 Short bibliography
 On Ultimate Justification (Letztbegründung)

20th-century German philosophers
1930 births
Living people
German male writers
Scientists from Freiburg im Breisgau